This is a list of mayors of Anchorage, Alaska, United States.  Anchorage was incorporated as a city on November 23, 1920. The Greater Anchorage Area Borough, which encompassed the city, was created in January 1964. The two were merged in a unified government called the Municipality of Anchorage on September 15, 1975. Under the current mayoral system, the mayor of the Municipality of Anchorage is elected in a non-partisan election to a three-year term and they are limited to two terms in office.

Mayors of the City of Anchorage

Mayors of Greater Anchorage Area Borough

Mayors of the Municipality of Anchorage

See also 
 History of Anchorage, Alaska
 Timeline of Anchorage, Alaska

References

External links
 Honor Roll of Anchorage Mayors

Anchorage